The Chinese Ambassador to Kazakhstan is the official representative of the People's Republic of China to the Republic of Kazakhstan.

List of representatives

References 

 
Kazakhstan
China